The third series of China's Got Talent, also known as Head & Shoulders China's Got Talent for sponsor reasons, premiered on DragonTV on November 13, 2011 with a look at the pre-audition process for the first time. The judges audition process for the third series premieres a week after.

Special Guest

The first episode at the 3rd Season the show opened with special guest such as Tian Ma, (winner of the 2nd season and Daniela Anahi Bessia a famous Expat in China.

Auditions

Auditions were held in Shanghai Concert Hall. Former judge Gao Xiaosong, Chinese modern dancer Huang Doudou, and series one winner, Liu Wei shared judging duties when Jerry Huang was absent. Actress and host Ni Ping shared hosting duties when Annie Yi was absent. The only judge that was not absent in all seven auditions was Zhou Libo, which was his last season as a judge.

Top 14 Selection Show 

This round is a new format for the show. Acts (with the exception of contestants who already had advanced or eliminated in the beginning of the show) need to perform second time for the judges at the Shanghai Arena who then pick select acts to move on to the semifinals in Beijing at Great Hall of the People.

Italics are wild cards that were given a second chance and be added to the top 14 which makes it 16.

Semifinals
The semifinals began on January 15, 2011. The Great Hall of the People in Beijing was the venue for the semifinals. Cui Yongyuan, a very popular Chinese host joins Zhou Libo and Jerry Huang as judges.

Rules
When the contestant is performing, judges can press their buzzers if the judges dislike the performance. When all three buzzer is pressed, the contestant must stop.

When the contestant is finished with their performance, a media jury of 143 can vote by raising signs that were given to them: yes (blue-colored signs) or no (red-colored signs). The most votes from the jury's votes will be automatically be in the finals. For second finalist, each of three judges has a chance of giving 10 votes to the 7 remaining contestants. Contestant who gets the most votes advance to the final. For the third finalist, judges vote between the third and fourth place contestants, and choose the best of three.

Italics indicate the second stage where each judges gave 10 points to their favorites. The contestants with the most votes combined with the jury points and judges' points will be the second finalist of the week.

Week 1 (Jan 15th, 2012)

Week 2 (Jan 16th, 2012)

Finals

Guest performers and presenters

Season 6 of America's Got Talents contestant Those Funny Little People performed with China's Got Talent series 1's semifinalist, Zhu Jie as she sang Over the Rainbow. Those Funny Little People also performed and sang It's Raining Men. Series 2's winner of Britain's Got Talent, George Sampson performer a hip-hop dance routine with Zhuo Jun, winner of China's Got Talent (series 2). Britain's Got Talent (Series 3)'s 4th place finisher, Stavros Flatley performed their Irish dance routine. Jai McDowall, winner of series 5's of Britain's Got Talent,  performed "Time to Say Goodbye" with runner up of series 2 of China's Got Talent, Cai Hongping. Jai McDowall also performed With Or Without You off his debut studio album, Believe. Nathan Burton, a comedic magician from America's Got Talents season 1 also performed.

Chinese-American comedian Joe Wong was a presenter.

Rules

Before the final 6 acts performed one last time, the judges picked two more contestants from the semifinals to the finals for second chance. They were Peace and Cavalry and Huo Chunyu. Each 8 acts will perform for the judges and the judges will decide who will make it to the next stage. It is based on best of three. The second stage is by text voting by the Chinese public and it will determine the final four. The third stage will determine who is the top 2 and this is picked by the judges. The last stage, 121 selected jury will determine who is the winner. The individual who reaches 61 points will declared winner.

References
China's Got Talent (ChinasGotTalent.org)

2011 Chinese television seasons
2012 Chinese television seasons
China's Got Talent